Yokesone Monastery (Yokesone Kyaung) is a common name for historic Burmese Buddhist monasteries (kyaung). The name may refer to the following monasteries:
 Yokesone Monastery, Mandalay
 Yokesone Monastery, Sagaing
 Yokesone Monastery, Salay
 Yokesone Monastery, Sagu
 Yokesone Monastery, Legaing

Monasteries in Myanmar